The postpaid mobile phone is a mobile phone for which service is provided by a prior arrangement with a mobile network operator. The user in this situation is billed after the fact according to their use of mobile services at the end of each month. Typically, the customer's contract specifies a limit or "allowance" of minutes, text messages etc., and the customer will be billed at a flat rate for any usage equal to or less than that allowance. Any usage above that limit incurs extra charges. Theoretically, a user in this situation has no limit on use of mobile services and, as a consequence, unlimited credit. This service is better for people with a secured income.

Postpaid service mobile phone typically requires two essential components in order to make the 'post-usage' model viable:
Credit history/Contractual commitment. This is the basis on which the service provider is able to trust the customer with paying their bill when it is due and to have legal recourse in case of non-payment
Service tenure. Most postpaid providers require customers to sign long term (1–3 year) contracts committing to use of the service. Failure to complete the term would make the customer liable for early termination fees.

The bill itself is an important component of the services which acts as an ambassador of the service provider and at times as an evidence of the service itself. The bill needs to be readable, comprehensible as well as aesthetically attractive for the subscriber to be interested enough to see details other than the bill amount. 

The United States and Canada are examples of countries dominated by postpaid providers, including AT&T, T-Mobile, and Verizon in the US and Bell, Rogers, and Telus in Canada, among others. In the US a smaller market has been captured by prepaid providers such as Boost Mobile, Metro by T-Mobile, Cricket Wireless, TracFone, and Ting, which use postpaid providers networks (e.g. Cricket runs on AT&T’s network).

Mobile telecommunication services
ru:Биллинг#Prepaid

The alternative billing method is a prepaid mobile phone where a user pays in advance for credit which is then consumed by use of the mobile phone service.